was the 6th daimyō of Aizu Domain in southern Mutsu Province,  Japan (modern-day Fukushima Prefecture).

Biography
Matsudaira Kataoki was the eldest son of Matsudaira Katasada, the ninth son of Matsudaira Masakata, 3rd daimyō of Aizu Domain. In 1789, he received the courtesy titles of "Jijū" and "Wakasa-no-kami": however, the 5th  daimyō of Aizu, Matsudaira Katanobu, died before formal adoption procedures were completed, and Kataoki was thus a posthumous adoption. He shows signs of continuing the fiscal reform policies of Matsudaira Katanobu, but died less than 5 months after assuming office.

His wife was a daughter of Ii Naohide of Hikone Domain; however his second son and heir, Matsudaira Katahiro, was born to a concubine of the Ishikawa clan.

References 
 The content of much of this article was derived from that of the corresponding article on Japanese Wikipedia.

Shinpan daimyo
Aizu-Matsudaira clan
1779 births
1806 deaths